The Crowsnest Formation, also called the Crowsnest Volcanics, is a geological formation in southwestern Alberta, Canada, on the southwestern margin of the Western Canada Sedimentary Basin. It was named for the Crowsnest Pass near Coleman, Alberta. The formation consists mostly of pyroclastic rocks that were laid down in a series of explosive eruptions about 100 million years ago during the Albian stage of the Early Cretaceous epoch. It contains unusual minerals such as melanite (a variety of andradite garnet) and analcime (a variety of zeolite).

Lithology and mineralogy
The formation contains pyroclastic flows, lahars, agglomerates, tuffs and ash-fall deposits, as well as volcanic-rich sandstones and other sediments. The whole-rock chemistry of the volcanics is relatively normal, ranging from trachyandesite (latite) to phonolite and trachyte, but the mineralogy is unusual. In addition to analcime and melanite, common minerals include sanidine, aegerine-augite and chlorite. Blairmorite, a rare analcime-rich rock-type named for the town of Blairmore, Alberta, is known only from the Crowsnest Formation and a locality in Mozambique.

Stratigraphy
The Crowsnest Formation is the uppermost unit of the Blairmore Group. Exposures along the Crowsnest Highway (Highway 3) and the railroad west of Coleman are the type locality.  It is underlain by the Ma Butte Formation (also known as the Mill Creek Formation). The contact is gradational, with volcanic fragments becoming progressively more common toward the top of the Ma Butte Formation. The lower part of the formation is trachytic with abundant sanidine phenocrysts, melanite and pyroxene. The upper part contains sanidine, analcime, melanite and rock fragments. It is unconformably overlain by the shales of the Blackstone Formation that were deposited during a marine transgression in the Late Cretaceous.

Deposition
The volcanics were laid down on an inland floodplain that is represented by the underlying Ma Butte Formation. The eruptions probably occurred to the west near what is now Cranbrook, British Columbia, and the material was subsequently moved eastward by thrust faulting during the Laramide orogeny.

Thickness and distribution
The Crowsnest Volcanics are exposed along a series of folded, west-dipping fault plates in the Front Ranges and foothills of the southern Canadian Rockies. They reach maximum thicknesses of  along a trend that extends northward from Coleman along McGillivray Ridge to Ma Butte.

See also
Volcanism of Canada
Volcanism of Western Canada
Geography of Alberta

References

Volcanism of Alberta
Cretaceous volcanism
Stratigraphy of Alberta
Geologic formations of Canada
Albian Stage
Cretaceous Canada
Sandstone formations of Canada
Tuff formations